State Highway 316 (SH 316) is a Texas state highway that runs from near Port Lavaca southeast to the ghost town of Indianola.  This route was designated on April 1, 1939.

Route description
SH 316 begins at a junction with SH 238.  It heads southeast from this junction to an intersection with FM 2717.  The highway continues to the east to an intersection with FM 2760.  SH 316 reaches its eastern terminus at Matagorda Bay. The road officially loops around the Indianola historical marker though the eastern side of the loop is closed off to vehicles.

Junction list

References

316
Transportation in Calhoun County, Texas